The 1987 Davis Cup (also known as the 1987 Davis Cup by NEC for sponsorship purposes) was the 76th edition of the Davis Cup, the most important tournament between national teams in men's tennis. 72 teams would enter the competition, 16 in the World Group, 32 in the Europe Zone (including 11 in the Africa Zone), 13 in the Eastern Zone, and 11 in the Americas Zone.

Sweden defeated India in the final, held at the Scandinavium in Gothenburg, Sweden, on 18–20 December, to win their 4th Davis Cup title.

World Group

Draw

Final
Sweden vs. India

Relegation play-offs

Date: 24–26 July

Americas Zone

  are promoted to the World Group in 1988.

Eastern Zone

  are promoted to the World Group in 1988.

Europe Zone

Africa Zone

  and  qualified to the Europe Zone main draws.

Europe Zone A

  are promoted to the World Group in 1988.

Europe Zone B

  are promoted to the World Group in 1988.

References
General

Specific

External links
Davis Cup Official Website

 
Davis Cups by year
Davis Cup
Davis Cup